The Aiguille des Grands Charmoz (3,445 m) is a mountain in the Mont Blanc Massif in Haute-Savoie, France.

References

Alpine three-thousanders
Mountains of Haute-Savoie
Mountains of the Alps
Mont Blanc massif